Bentley railway station is a railway station that serves Bentley, South Yorkshire, England.  It lies on the Wakefield Line and is managed by Northern, who also provide all the passenger trains serving it.  It was opened on 27 April 1992 by British Rail with financial assistance from the South Yorkshire Passenger Transport Executive. An earlier wooden halt, Bentley Crossing, built by the West Riding and Grimsby Railway, had previously existed at the same location but was closed by 1943.
 
A common complaint is the lack of a footbridge between the two platforms. Passengers have to cross through the road barrier to get from one side to the other; therefore they may have to wait until trains have passed, and could miss their trains. The Wakefield Line is busy with London North Eastern Railway services and freight services as well as the Northern operations.

Bentley is a popular commuting station for Leeds and Wakefield. It has a large car park for the size of the station and as such is a good station for Park and Ride to Doncaster. However possibly due to the footbridge issue, Adwick station is the dedicated park and ride station for Doncaster.

Facilities
The station is unstaffed and has recently (April 2018) been equipped with a ticking vending machine at the entrance to the car park adjacent to the north-bound platform 2. This machine however only accepts card payments so also issues promise-to-pay notices for exchange on the train, as well as advertising the availability of e-ticketing via the Northern mobile app.  There are waiting shelters, digital CIS displays and timetable poster boards on both platforms; train running information is also available by telephone.  Step-free access is available to both platforms via the level crossing.

Services
There are two trains per hour in each direction from the station on weekdays, southbound to Doncaster and northbound to Adwick.

Sundays see a two-hourly service each way to Doncaster and Leeds.

References

Railway stations in Doncaster
DfT Category F1 stations
Railway stations opened by British Rail
Railway stations in Great Britain opened in 1992
Northern franchise railway stations